Alessia Vigilia (born 1 September 1999) is an Italian racing cyclist, who currently rides for UCI Women's Continental Team .

Major results
2019
10th Donostia San Sebastian Klasikoa Women 
2022
 7th A Travers les Hauts de France féminin 
2023
 1st Umag Trophy LADIES

References

External links
 

1999 births
Living people
Italian female cyclists
Sportspeople from Bolzano
Cyclists from Trentino-Alto Adige/Südtirol